Ring 2 is a ring road that surrounds the most central part of Copenhagen, Denmark. It is part of the Danish national road network. The total length of the road is about 26 km.

Names

Streets in Copenhagen
Ring roads in Denmark